San Román de Cameros is a village in the province and autonomous community of La Rioja, Spain.

Demographics

Population centres
 San Román de Cameros
 Avellaneda
 El Mirón
 Montalbo en Cameros
 Santa María en Cameros
 Vadillos
 Valdeosera
 Velilla

Politics

Notable people
 Mariano de la Paz Graells
 Augusto Ibáñez Sacristán

References

Populated places in La Rioja (Spain)